Pavlovo is the name of several inhabited localities in Russia.

Arkhangelsk Oblast
As of 2010, one rural locality in Arkhangelsk Oblast bears this name:
Pavlovo, Arkhangelsk Oblast, a village under the administrative jurisdiction of the town of oblast significance of Novodvinsk

Ivanovo Oblast
As of 2010, one rural locality in Ivanovo Oblast bears this name:
Pavlovo, Ivanovo Oblast, a village in Yuryevetsky District

Kaliningrad Oblast
As of 2010, one rural locality in Kaliningrad Oblast bears this name:
Pavlovo, Kaliningrad Oblast, a settlement in Novostroyevsky Rural Okrug of Ozyorsky District

Kaluga Oblast
As of 2010, three rural localities in Kaluga Oblast bear this name:
Pavlovo, Borovsky District, Kaluga Oblast, a village in Borovsky District
Pavlovo, Kozelsky District, Kaluga Oblast, a village in Kozelsky District
Pavlovo, Mosalsky District, Kaluga Oblast, a village in Mosalsky District

Kirov Oblast
As of 2010, two rural localities in Kirov Oblast bear this name:
Pavlovo, Pizhansky District, Kirov Oblast, a village in Izhevsky Rural Okrug of Pizhansky District
Pavlovo, Sanchursky District, Kirov Oblast, a village in Smetaninsky Rural Okrug of Sanchursky District

Kostroma Oblast
As of 2010, four rural localities in Kostroma Oblast bear this name:
Pavlovo, Galichsky District, Kostroma Oblast, a village in Orekhovskoye Settlement of Galichsky District
Pavlovo, Kologrivsky District, Kostroma Oblast, a village in Sukhoverkhovskoye Settlement of Kologrivsky District
Pavlovo, Parfenyevsky District, Kostroma Oblast, a village in Parfenyevskoye Settlement of Parfenyevsky District
Pavlovo, Sharyinsky District, Kostroma Oblast, a village in Shangskoye Settlement of Sharyinsky District

Leningrad Oblast
As of 2010, three inhabited localities in Leningrad Oblast bear this name.

Urban localities
Pavlovo, Kirovsky District, Leningrad Oblast, an urban-type settlement in Pavlovskoye Settlement Municipal Formation of Kirovsky District

Rural localities
Pavlovo, Kingiseppsky District, Leningrad Oblast, a village in Nezhnovskoye Settlement Municipal Formation of Kingiseppsky District
Pavlovo, Vsevolozhsky District, Leningrad Oblast, a slobodka in Koltushskoye Settlement Municipal Formation of Vsevolozhsky District

Nizhny Novgorod Oblast
As of 2010, four inhabited localities in Nizhny Novgorod Oblast bear this name.

Urban localities
Pavlovo, Pavlovsky District, Nizhny Novgorod Oblast, a town in Pavlovsky District; administratively incorporated as a town of district significance

Rural localities
Pavlovo, Semyonov, Nizhny Novgorod Oblast, a village in Ogibnovsky Selsoviet of the town of oblast significance of Semyonov
Pavlovo, Koverninsky District, Nizhny Novgorod Oblast, a village in Gorevsky Selsoviet of Koverninsky District
Pavlovo, Urensky District, Nizhny Novgorod Oblast, a village in Bolshepesochninsky Selsoviet of Urensky District

Novgorod Oblast
As of 2010, three rural localities in Novgorod Oblast bear this name:
Pavlovo, Krestetsky District, Novgorod Oblast, a khutor in Zaytsevskoye Settlement of Krestetsky District
Pavlovo, Lyubytinsky District, Novgorod Oblast, a village under the administrative jurisdiction of the urban-type settlement of Lyubytino in Lyubytinsky District
Pavlovo, Maryovsky District, Novgorod Oblast, a village in Molvotitskoye Settlement of Maryovsky District

Novosibirsk Oblast
As of 2010, one rural locality in Novosibirsk Oblast bears this name:
Pavlovo, Novosibirsk Oblast, a selo in Vengerovsky District

Oryol Oblast
As of 2010, two rural localities in Oryol Oblast bear this name:
Pavlovo, Trosnyansky District, Oryol Oblast, a village in Malakhovo-Slobodskoy Selsoviet of Trosnyansky District
Pavlovo, Zalegoshchensky District, Oryol Oblast, a village in Lomovsky Selsoviet of Zalegoshchensky District

Perm Krai
As of 2010, one rural locality in Perm Krai bears this name:
Pavlovo, Perm Krai, a village in Ordinsky District

Pskov Oblast
As of 2010, eleven rural localities in Pskov Oblast bear this name:
Pavlovo (Kudeverskaya Rural Settlement), Bezhanitsky District, Pskov Oblast, a village in Bezhanitsky District; municipally, a part of Kudeverskaya Rural Settlement of that district
Pavlovo (Lyushchikskaya Rural Settlement), Bezhanitsky District, Pskov Oblast, a village in Bezhanitsky District; municipally, a part of Lyushchikskaya Rural Settlement of that district
Pavlovo, Loknyansky District, Pskov Oblast, a village in Loknyansky District
Pavlovo, Ostrovsky District, Pskov Oblast, a village in Ostrovsky District
Pavlovo (Cherskaya Rural Settlement), Palkinsky District, Pskov Oblast, a village in Palkinsky District; municipally, a part of Cherskaya Rural Settlement of that district
Pavlovo (Kachanovskaya Rural Settlement), Palkinsky District, Pskov Oblast, a village in Palkinsky District; municipally, a part of Kachanovskaya Rural Settlement of that district
Pavlovo, Pechorsky District, Pskov Oblast, a village in Pechorsky District
Pavlovo, Pytalovsky District, Pskov Oblast, a village in Pytalovsky District
Pavlovo, Sebezhsky District, Pskov Oblast, a village in Sebezhsky District
Pavlovo, Strugo-Krasnensky District, Pskov Oblast, a village in Strugo-Krasnensky District
Pavlovo, Velikoluksky District, Pskov Oblast, a village in Velikoluksky District

Ryazan Oblast
As of 2010, one rural locality in Ryazan Oblast bears this name:
Pavlovo, Ryazan Oblast, a village in Busayevsky Rural Okrug of Klepikovsky District

Smolensk Oblast
As of 2010, six rural localities in Smolensk Oblast bear this name:
Pavlovo, Gagarinsky District, Smolensk Oblast, a village in Samuylovskoye Rural Settlement of Gagarinsky District
Pavlovo, Krasninsky District, Smolensk Oblast, a village in Pavlovskoye Rural Settlement of Krasninsky District
Pavlovo, Pochinkovsky District, Smolensk Oblast, a village in Shmakovskoye Rural Settlement of Pochinkovsky District
Pavlovo, Safonovsky District, Smolensk Oblast, a village in Staroselskoye Rural Settlement of Safonovsky District
Pavlovo, Vyazemsky District, Smolensk Oblast, a village in Maslovskoye Rural Settlement of Vyazemsky District
Pavlovo, Yartsevsky District, Smolensk Oblast, a village in Miropolskoye Rural Settlement of Yartsevsky District

Tomsk Oblast
As of 2010, one rural locality in Tomsk Oblast bears this name:
Pavlovo, Tomsk Oblast, a selo in Kargasoksky District

Tula Oblast
As of 2010, two rural localities in Tula Oblast bear this name:
Pavlovo, Aleksinsky District, Tula Oblast, a village in Michurinsky Rural Okrug of Aleksinsky District
Pavlovo, Shchyokinsky District, Tula Oblast, a village in Nikolskaya Rural Administration of Shchyokinsky District

Tver Oblast
As of 2010, six rural localities in Tver Oblast bear this name:
Pavlovo, Kalyazinsky District, Tver Oblast, a village in Kalyazinsky District
Pavlovo (Tolmachevskoye Rural Settlement), Likhoslavlsky District, Tver Oblast, a village in Likhoslavlsky District; municipally, a part of Tolmachevskoye Rural Settlement of that district
Pavlovo (Stanskoye Rural Settlement), Likhoslavlsky District, Tver Oblast, a village in Likhoslavlsky District; municipally, a part of Stanskoye Rural Settlement of that district
Pavlovo, Rameshkovsky District, Tver Oblast, a village in Rameshkovsky District
Pavlovo, Udomelsky District, Tver Oblast, a village in Udomelsky District
Pavlovo, Vyshnevolotsky District, Tver Oblast, a village in Vyshnevolotsky District

Udmurt Republic
As of 2010, one rural locality in the Udmurt Republic bears this name:
Pavlovo, Udmurt Republic, a village in Bulaysky Selsoviet of Uvinsky District

Vladimir Oblast
As of 2010, one rural locality in Vladimir Oblast bears this name:
Pavlovo, Vladimir Oblast, a village in Petushinsky District

Vologda Oblast
As of 2010, eleven rural localities in Vologda Oblast bear this name:
Pavlovo, Babushkinsky District, Vologda Oblast, a village in Bereznikovsky Selsoviet of Babushkinsky District
Pavlovo, Belozersky District, Vologda Oblast, a village in Glushkovsky Selsoviet of Belozersky District
Pavlovo, Cherepovetsky District, Vologda Oblast, a village in Yaganovsky Selsoviet of Cherepovetsky District
Pavlovo, Pogossky Selsoviet, Kichmengsko-Gorodetsky District, Vologda Oblast, a village in Pogossky Selsoviet of Kichmengsko-Gorodetsky District
Pavlovo, Sarayevsky Selsoviet, Kichmengsko-Gorodetsky District, Vologda Oblast, a village in Sarayevsky Selsoviet of Kichmengsko-Gorodetsky District
Pavlovo, Nikolsky District, Vologda Oblast, a village in Argunovsky Selsoviet of Nikolsky District
Pavlovo, Sokolsky District, Vologda Oblast, a village in Chuchkovsky Selsoviet of Sokolsky District
Pavlovo, Vashkinsky District, Vologda Oblast, a village in Ukhtomsky Selsoviet of Vashkinsky District
Pavlovo, Velikoustyugsky District, Vologda Oblast, a village in Orlovsky Selsoviet of Velikoustyugsky District
Pavlovo, Nesvoysky Selsoviet, Vologodsky District, Vologda Oblast, a village in Nesvoysky Selsoviet of Vologodsky District
Pavlovo, Novlensky Selsoviet, Vologodsky District, Vologda Oblast, a village in Novlensky Selsoviet of Vologodsky District

Yaroslavl Oblast
As of 2010, eight rural localities in Yaroslavl Oblast bear this name:
Pavlovo, Novoselsky Rural Okrug, Bolsheselsky District, Yaroslavl Oblast, a village in Novoselsky Rural Okrug of Bolsheselsky District
Pavlovo, Varegovsky Rural Okrug, Bolsheselsky District, Yaroslavl Oblast, a village in Varegovsky Rural Okrug of Bolsheselsky District
Pavlovo, Krasnooktyabrsky Rural Okrug, Borisoglebsky District, Yaroslavl Oblast, a selo in Krasnooktyabrsky Rural Okrug of Borisoglebsky District
Pavlovo, Yakovtsevsky Rural Okrug, Borisoglebsky District, Yaroslavl Oblast, a village in Yakovtsevsky Rural Okrug of Borisoglebsky District
Pavlovo, Gavrilov-Yamsky District, Yaroslavl Oblast, a village in Stavotinsky Rural Okrug of Gavrilov-Yamsky District
Pavlovo, Myshkinsky District, Yaroslavl Oblast, a village in Rozhdestvensky Rural Okrug of Myshkinsky District
Pavlovo, Nekouzsky District, Yaroslavl Oblast, a village in Rodionovsky Rural Okrug of Nekouzsky District
Pavlovo, Nekrasovsky District, Yaroslavl Oblast, a village in Abbakumtsevsky Rural Okrug of Nekrasovsky District

See also
Pavel
Pavlov (disambiguation)
Pavlovka (disambiguation)
Pavlovsk (disambiguation)
Pavlovsky (disambiguation)